The Boxer (Spanish: El boxeador) is a 1958 Mexican sports drama film directed by Gilberto Gazcón and starring Joaquín Cordero, Ariadna Welter and Arturo Martinez.

It was shot at the Estudios Churubusco in Mexico City. The film's sets were designed by Salvador Lozano Mena.

Cast
 Joaquín Cordero as Natalio Sanchez; Kid Relampago  
 Ariadna Welter as Carmen  
 Arturo Martinez as Indio López  
 Alfonso Mejía as Ray Corona 
 Miguel Ángel Ferriz as Doctor  
 Carlos Ancira as Ronco  
 Fanny Schiller as Madrastra de Carmen  
 Enrique King as Entrenador 
 Antonio Raxel as Don Arturo  
 Francisco Rosales
 Guillermo Herrera as Hermano de Lupita  
 Norma Angélica as Lupita  
 Rogelio 'Frijolitos' Jiménez Pons as Espectador niño  
 Ismael Rodríguez 
 Salvador Lozano as Marido espectador boxeo  
 José L. Murillo as Médico de la comisión  
 Mario Cid as Revendedor de boletos  
 José Luis Trejo
 Luis Aguilar as Cantante  
 José Elías Moreno as Papá de Carmen  
 Paco Malgesto as Paquito, locutor  
 Celia D'Alarcón as Esposa espectadora boxeo  
 Pancho Córdova as Amigo borracho de don Chon 
 Pascual García Peña as Don Chon, borracho  
 Luis Aldás as Espectador  
 Freddy Fernández as Espectador  
 Memo Diéz as Boxeador  
 Jose Becerra as Boxeador  
 Nacho Escalante as Boxeador 
 Papelero Sánchez as Boxeador 
 Gregorio Acosta as Espectador  
 Regino Herrera as Espectador 
 Mario Sevilla as Doctor  
 Amado Zumaya as Boxeador ciego

References

Bibliography 
 Emilio García Riera. Historia documental del cine mexicano: 1957-1958. Universidad de Guadalajara, 1992.

External links 
 

1958 films
1950s sports drama films
Mexican sports drama films
1950s Spanish-language films
Mexican boxing films
1958 drama films
1950s Mexican films